Manifesto of Lacuna Coil is the second compilation album by Italian gothic metal band Lacuna Coil, released on 27 February 2009. Tracks are taken from the first four studio albums; In a Reverie, Unleashed Memories, Comalies & Karmacode, as well as from their two EPs; Lacuna Coil & Halflife.

Track listing
All songs written by Lacuna Coil, except "Enjoy the Silence" written by Martin Gore

References

Lacuna Coil albums
Century Media Records albums
2009 albums